INOX Wind Limited is an Indian wind energy service provider. Headquartered in Noida, India, the company is a subsidiary of the INOX Group. INOX Wind Limited manufactures Wind Turbine Generators (WTGs) and provides services including wind resource assessment, site acquisition, infrastructure development, erection and
commissioning, and long term operations and maintenance of wind power projects. INOX Wind was ranked 167th in Business Today's 2015 list of the 500 most valuable companies in India.

INOX Wind Limited is a publicly traded company listed on the National Stock Exchange of India (NSE:INOXWIND) and the Bombay Stock Exchange (BSE:539083).

INOX Group

INOX Wind Limited is a subsidiary of the INOX Group of Companies whose interests include industrial gases, refrigerants, engineering plastics, chemicals, carbon credits, cryogenic engineering, renewable energy and entertainment. The INOX Group employs close to 9,000 people and its distributor network spans more than 50 countries. Other subsidiaries include INOX Air Products Limited, Gujarat Fluorochemicals Limited, INOX India Limited, INOX Renewables Limited, and INOX Leisure Limited.

Manufacturing Facilities

INOX Wind Limited has three manufacturing plants in Gujarat, Himachal Pradesh and Madhya Pradesh. The plant near Ahmedabad (Gujarat) manufactures Blades & Tubular Towers while Hubs & Nacelles are manufactured at the company’s facility at Una (Himachal Pradesh). The new integrated manufacturing facility at Barwani (Madhya Pradesh) manufactures blades, towers and will manufacture nacelles and hubs. The facility in Madhya Pradesh has doubled the company's manufacturing capacity to 1,600 MW per annum.

Technology Partner

INOX Wind has sourced technology from AMSC, Austria, a wholly owned subsidiary of USA based American Superconductor Corporation. INOX Wind has an exclusive and perpetual licence from AMSC to manufacture 2 MW wind turbines in India. AMSC provides wind turbine electronic controls and systems, designs and engineering services that reduces the cost of wind energy.

Products

INOX Wind's flagship product is the 2 MW DFIG (Double Fed Induction Generator). The company currently manufactures three variants of the 2 MW WTG- the 93.3 meter rotor diameter, the 100 meter rotor diameter, and the 113 meter rotor diameter.

References

Wind power in India
Engineering companies of India
2009 establishments in Uttar Pradesh
Companies based in Noida
Inox Group
Companies listed on the National Stock Exchange of India
Companies listed on the Bombay Stock Exchange